Charles Lawrence Boynton (February 7, 1864 – September 16, 1943) was an American botanist active in the Southeastern United States, working at Biltmore Estate with Chauncey Beadle and his brother, Frank Ellis Boynton.  The oak species Quercus boyntonii was named in honor of Charles Lawrence Boynton.

References 

 
 

American botanists
1864 births
1943 deaths